The 1932 college football season saw the Michigan Wolverines win the Knute Rockne Memorial Trophy as national champion under the math-based Dickinson System.  Because the "Big Nine" conference didn't permit its teams to play in the postseason, however, the Wolverines were not able to accept a bid to the Rose Bowl. As such, the Pasadena game matched the No. 2 and No. 3 teams, USC and Pittsburgh, with the USC Trojans winning the east–west matchup 35–0. The other four contemporary math system selectors (the Boand, Dunkel, Houlgate, and Williamson Systems) all selected USC as national champion.

Conference and program changes

Conference changes
Two new conferences began play in 1932:
Tri-State Conference – conference active through the 1961 season; later known as the Badger State Intercollegiate Conference, Badger-Illini Conference, and Badger-Gopher Conference
Northern Teachers Athletic Conference – an active NCAA Division II conference, later known as the Northern Intercollegiate Conference and now the Northern Sun Intercollegiate Conference
One conference played its final season in 1932:
Big Four Conference – conference active since 1929; members from Oklahoma

Membership changes

September
On September 17, Texas Christian University (TCU) opened its season with a 14–2 win over visiting North Texas.

September 24 USC beat Utah 35–0, Tennessee won 13–0 at UT-Chattanooga, and Pittsburgh beat visiting Ohio Northern College 47–0.  TCU and LSU played to a 3–3 tie in Baton Rouge.

October

October 1  Michigan beat Michigan State 26–0, Purdue beat Kansas State 29–13, Ohio State beat Ohio Wesleyan 34–7, Wisconsin beat Marquette 7–2.   USC beat Washington State 20–0.  Pittsburgh won at West Virginia, 40–0.  Army beat Furman 13–0.  Tennessee beat Ole Miss 33–0 and TCU defeated Daniel Baker College 55–0.

October 8  Michigan beat Northwestern 15–6, Wisconsin beat Iowa 34–0, Purdue won at Minnesota 7–0, and Ohio State and Indiana played to a 7–7 tie.  USC beat Oregon State 10–0.  Pittsburgh beat Duquesne 33–0.  Army beat Carleton College 57–0. Notre Dame opened with a 73–0 win over Haskell College.  Tennessee beat North Carolina 20–7 and TCU beat Arkansas 34–12.

October 15  In Birmingham, Tennessee and Alabama, both 3–0–0, met, with the visitors winning 7–3.  Michigan won at Ohio State 14–0, while Purdue beat visiting Wisconsin 7–6, and Pittsburgh won at Army  18–13.  TCU won at Texas A&M 17–0, USC defeated Loyola Marymount 6–0 and Notre Dame beat Drake 62–0.

October 22 USC (4–0–0) and Stanford (5–0–0) met at Palo Alto, with USC winning 13–0.  At Pittsburgh, Ohio State and Pitt played to a 0–0 tie.  Michigan beat Illinois 32–0, Purdue tied at Northwestern 7–7, and Wisconsin shut out Iowa's Coe College 39–0.  Notre Dame beat Carnegie Tech 42–0.  Army won at Yale 20–0.  Tennessee beat Maryville College 60–0 and TCU beat Austin College 68–0

October 29  Pittsburgh (4–0–1) hosted Notre Dame (3–0–0) and won 12–0.  Ohio State and Wisconsin played to a 7–7 tie giving OSU a record of 1–1–3.  Michigan defeated Princeton 14–7 and Purdue beat NYU 34–9 at Yankee Stadium.  Army beat William & Mary 33–0.  Tennessee beat visiting Duke, 16–13, and TCU defeated Baylor 27–0.

November
November 5 Notre Dame won at Kansas University, 24–6.  Michigan won at Indiana 7–0, Ohio State won at Northwestern 20–6, Wisconsin beat Illinois 20–12 and Purdue won at Chicago 37–0.    Pittsburgh won at Penn, 19–12.  USC beat California 27–7.  Army won at Harvard 46–0
Tennessee beat Mississippi State 31–0 and TCU won at Hardin-Simmonds 27–0.

November 11  On Armistice Day, TCU (8–0–1) hosted Texas (6–1–0) and won 14–0.

November 12  In Nashville, Tennessee (7–0–0) and Vanderbilt (6–0–1), played to a scoreless tie.   Michigan beat Chicago 12–0, Purdue won at Iowa 18–0, and Wisconsin beat Minnesota 20–13.  Ohio State beat Penn 19–0.  USC beat Oregon 33–0.   Army beat North Dakota State 52–0.   At Lincoln, Neb., Pittsburgh and Nebraska played to a 0–0 tie.  At Chicago, Notre Dame beat Northwestern 21–0
 
November 19  Michigan closed its season with a 3–0 win at Minnesota, Ohio State closed at Illinois with the same 3–0 score.  Wisconsin won at Chicago 18–7, and Purdue beat Indiana 25–7.   Notre Dame defeated Navy in a game at Cleveland, 12–0.  Pittsburgh beat Carnegie Tech, 6–0.  In Houston, TCU beat Rice 16–6.  Army narrowly beat visiting West Virginia Wesleyan 7–0.   At Providence, Colgate (8–0–0) and Brown University (7–0–0) faced each other for the season-ender for both teams.  Colgate had held its first 8 opponents scoreless, and the nation waited to see if that streak would be ended by Colgate's toughest opponent of the year.  Colgate's Red Raiders won 21–0 to close the season with a 264–0 edge on its opposition.

November 24  On Thanksgiving Day, USC won at Washington 9–6; that win, along with California's 3–0 loss to Washington State, gave USC the Pacific Coast crown and a trip to the Rose Bowl.

November 26 At Yankee Stadium, Notre Dame beat Army 21–0.  Pittsburgh beat visiting Stanford 7–0 to close its season unbeaten (8–0–2).  Tennessee beat Kentucky 26–0.  TCU closed its season at Dallas, with an 8–0 win over SMU.  In eleven games, TCU had registered seven shutouts, and finished unbeaten (10–0–1).

December
December 3 In the Army–Navy Game at Philadelphia, Army won 20–0.  In Jacksonville, Tennessee beat Florida to close its season unbeaten (9–0–1).

December 10 In Los Angeles, USC (9–0–0) hosted Notre Dame (7–1–0) and won 13–0.

1933 Rose Bowl

USC had beaten Pitt in the 1933 Rose Bowl, 47–14, and the rematch three years later resulted in a larger defeat.  Before a crowd of 84,000 the previously unbeaten Pitt Panthers reached the "red zone" only twice.  In the second quarter, a long run gave the Panthers first down on the USC 24 yard line, but Warren Heller's pass fell in the end zone, and under the rules of the day, the result was a turnover (and a touchback, with USC given first down on the 20).  Pitt got another chance soon after on a blocked punt, but was stopped on downs.  With the help of holes opened up by Trojan halfback, USC scored five touchdowns (including three in the final quarter) and won 35–0.  With New Year's Day falling on a Sunday, the Rose Bowl took place on Monday, January 2, 1933

Conference standings

Major conference standings

Independents

Minor conferences

Minor conference standings

Dickinson System
The AP sportswriters' poll would not begin continuously until 1936. (although, the first time was a one instance publishing in 1934)  Frank G. Dickinson, an economics professor at the University of Illinois, had invented the Dickinson System to rank colleges based upon their records and the strength of their opposition.  
The system was originally designed to rank teams in the Big Nine (later the Big Ten) conference.  Chicago clothing manufacturer Jack Rissman then persuaded Dickinson to rank the nation's teams under the system, and awarded the Rissman Trophy to the winning university .

The system awarded 30 points for a win over a "strong team", and 20 for a win over a "weak team".  Losses were awarded points (15 for loss to a strong team, 10 for loss to a weak team).  Ties were treated as half a win and half a loss (22.5 for a tie with a strong team, 15 for a tie with a weak team).  An average was then derived by dividing the points by games played.

In addition, Professor Dickinson announced in 1932 that "differential points" would be factored in for an "intersectional game", with ratings of 0.00 for East schools, higher points for "Middlewest" (+4.77) and Southwest (+1.36), negatives for the South (-2.59), the Big Six (-2.60) and the Pacific Coast (-2.71).

Final Dickinson rankings
Michigan and USC were both unbeaten and untied, but as a "Middlewest" team, Michigan had a higher average rating.  The higher weight put four Big Ten Conference teams in Dickinson's top 11: Michigan, Ohio State, Purdue, and Wisconsin.

In 1932, the national championship trophy was presented to the winning school by the Four Horsemen of the 1924 Notre Dame Fighting Irish football team: Harry Stuhldreher, Jim Crowley, Don Miller, and Elmer Layden.

See also
 1932 College Football All-America Team

References